Natalya Petrovna Artyomova (born January 5, 1963, in Rostov-on-Don) is a retired middle-distance runner from Russia, who was one of the leading athletes in the women's 1500 metres and 3000 metres during the 1980s.

On July 4, 1992, traces of a banned steroid were allegedly found in her urine sample. She was banned by track's world governing body IAAF pending a hearing.

International competitions

References

New York Times
Sports Reference profile

1963 births
Living people
Doping cases in athletics
Russian female middle-distance runners
Soviet female middle-distance runners
Athletes (track and field) at the 1988 Summer Olympics
Olympic athletes of the Soviet Union
Russian sportspeople in doping cases
Sportspeople from Rostov-on-Don
World Athletics Championships athletes for the Soviet Union
Universiade medalists in athletics (track and field)
Goodwill Games medalists in athletics
Universiade bronze medalists for the Soviet Union
CIS Athletics Championships winners
Medalists at the 1987 Summer Universiade
Competitors at the 1990 Goodwill Games
Friendship Games medalists in athletics